The Kaunas Picture Gallery is an art museum based in Kaunas, Lithuania, which is a branch of the M. K. Čiurlionis National Art Museum. It houses part of the works donated by the famous Lithuanian collector Mykolas Žilinskas (along with the Mykolas Žilinskas Art Gallery).

References

Art museums and galleries in Lithuania
1978 establishments in Lithuania
Art museums established in 1978
Museums in Kaunas